Toys is a compilation consisting of unreleased music by American funk rock band Funkadelic. It was released by Westbound Records in 2008 and consists of previously unreleased sessions recorded during the band's tenure for Westbound. The album was originally scheduled to be released in 2002, but was delayed numerous times, presumably due to legal issues. The CD also features a video clip of the song "Cosmic Slop", which can only be viewed on a PC.

Track listing

"Heart Trouble aka You Can't Miss What You Can't Measure" Lead Vocal: Billy Bass & Eddie Hazel
"The Goose That Laid the Golden Egg" (Instrumental)
"Vampy Funky Bernie (3rd Tune Olympic)" (Instrumental)
"Talk About Jesus"
"Slide on In (2nd Olympic Tune)" (Instrumental)
"Stink Finger"
"Magnififunk" (Instrumental)
"Wars of Armegeddon" (Karaoke Version) (Instrumental)
"2 Dollars & 2 Dimes"
"Cosmic Slop" (Video clip shot on the streets of New York)

Personnel

Guitars - Eddie Hazel, Tawl Ross
Bass - Billy Bass Nelson
Drums - Tiki Fulwood, Brad Ennis on Talk about Jesus
Keyboards - Bernie Worrell
Vocals - George Clinton, Fuzzy Haskins, Calvin Simon, Grady Thomas, Ray Davis, Rose Williams, Pat Lewis, Diane Lewis, Telma Hopkins, Eddie Hazel, Billy Bass Nelson

References

External links
 Toys at Discogs

2008 albums
Funkadelic albums